Bernard Vise Lightman, FRSC (born April 30, 1950) is a Canadian historian, and professor of humanities and science and technology studies at York University, in Toronto, Ontario, Canada. He specializes in the relationship between Victorian science and unbelief, the role of women in science, and the popularization of science.

Lightman is known for his work as the editor of the journal Isis (2004 to present) as well as his role in the Tyndall project, an effort to make available the life and letters of the nineteenth-century scientist John Tyndall. Lightman has received several awards and honours. For example, on November 26, 2011, he was elected a Fellow of the Royal Society of Canada and on December 4, 2010, he was elected a Corresponding Member of the International Academy of the History of Science.

Life and works 
Lightman began his career studying Victorian agnosticism amongst prominent scientific naturalists, including such figures as Thomas Henry Huxley and John Tyndall. The focus of this work was on the ways in which early agnostics did not simply see their title as a mask for atheism, but instead based it on an understanding of the epistemology of the German philosopher Immanuel Kant. Since 1989, Lightman's work has largely focused on the popularization of science and particularly on the role that Victorian periodicals and print culture played in shaping the form of scientific debates in the public arena.

Lightman has authored, co-authored and edited several books, and has published more than 44 refereed articles and book-chapter. The John Tyndall Correspondence Project, which is an international collaborative effort to obtain, digitalize, transcribe, and publish all surviving letters to and from John Tyndall, was initiated by Lightman. He is currently working on a biography of John Tyndall and is a general editor on the project. In addition, he is the editor of a book series titled 'Science and Culture in the Nineteenth Century' published by the University of Pittsburgh Press.

At York University, Lightman has been appointed to a number of administrative positions over the years, including associate dean of arts, acting director of academic staff relation, coordinator of the interdisciplinary program science and society, and director of the graduate program in humanities.

Selected works

 Evolutionary Naturalism in Victorian Britain: The 'Darwinians' and Their Critics. Variorum Collected Studies Series. Burlington, Vermont, USA; Farnham, Surrey, England: Ashgate, 2009.
 Science in the Marketplace: Nineteenth-Century Sites and Experiences. Co-edited with Aileen Fyfe. Chicago: University of Chicago Press, 2007.
 Victorian Popularizers of Science: Designing Nature for New Audiences. Chicago: University of Chicago Press, 2007.
 Figuring it Out: Science, Gender and Visual Culture. Co-edited with Ann Shteir. Hanover, New Hampshire: Dartmouth College Press; Hanover and London: University Press of New England, 2006.
 Victorian Science in Context, Ed. Bernard Lightman. Chicago and London: University of Chicago Press, 1997.
 "Science and Religion in Modern Western Thought." Co-edited with Bernard Zelechow. Special theme issue of The European Legacy: 1, No. 5 (August 1996).
 Victorian Faith in Crisis: Essays on Continuity and Change in Nineteenth Century Religious Belief. Co-edited with Richard Helmstadter. Stanford, California: Stanford University Press; London: Macmillan Press, 1990.
 The Origins of Agnosticism: Victorian Unbelief and the Limits of Knowledge. Baltimore: Johns Hopkins University Press, 1987.

See also 

 Agnosticism
 Isis
 John Tyndall
 Royal Society of Canada
 SSHRC
 Science Wars
 Victorian Era
 York University

Footnotes

External links 
 Bernard Lightman
 New program examines the impact of science on our lives
 York prof looks at the correspondence of scientist John Tyndall

1950 births
20th-century Canadian historians
Canadian male non-fiction writers
Fellows of the Royal Society of Canada
Academic staff of York University
Living people
21st-century Canadian historians